Missione di pace is a 2011  Italian black comedy film directed by Francesco Lagi. It was the closer film at the Critics' Week at the 68th Venice International Film Festival.

Plot
Captain Vinciguerra, a veteran of the peacekeeping missions, is sent on a mission to Yugoslavia to capture a dangerous criminal on the run. However, the captain has an "enemy" in his family, Giacomo a pacifist, who will drive him crazy during his mission.

Cast 
Silvio Orlando as Sandro Vinciguerra
Alba Rohrwacher as Maria Pettariello
 Francesco Brandi as  Giacomo Vinciguerra
Filippo Timi as  Che Guevara
Bugo as  Quinzio
Antonella Attili as  Teresa Vinciguerra

See also  
 List of Italian films of 2011

References

External links

2011 films
2011 black comedy films
Italian black comedy films
2010s Italian films